Franklin is a census-designated place in Sacramento County, California, United States. The 2020 United States census reported Franklin's population at 167.

The town was named after the Franklin House that Andrew George built in 1856.

Several businesses operate in the town, including King's Skate Country and Hay Tone's Hangout.

Geography

Demographics 

The 2010 United States Census reported that Franklin had a population of 155. The racial make-up of Franklin was 119 (76.8%) White, 0 (0.0%) African American, 0 (0.0%) Native American, 5 (3.2%) Asian, 0 (0.0%) Pacific Islander, 20 (12.9%) from other races, and 11 (7.1%) from two or more races. Hispanic or Latino of any race were 42 persons (27.1%).

The census reported that 155 people (100% of the population) lived in households, 0 (0%) lived in non-institutionalized group quarters and 0 (0%) were institutionalized.

There were 62 households, of which 18 (29.0%) had children under the age of 18 living in them, 27 (43.5%) were opposite-sex married couples living together, 5 (8.1%) had a female householder with no husband present, 3 (4.8%) had a male householder with no wife present.  There were 6 (9.7%) unmarried opposite-sex partnerships, and 0 (0%) same-sex married couples or partnerships. 21 households (33.9%) were made up of individuals, and 8 (12.9%) had someone living alone who was 65 years of age or older. The average household size was 2.50.  There were 35 families (56.5% of all households); the average family size was 3.34.

30 people (19.4%) were under the age of 18, 17 people (11.0%) aged 18 to 24, 36 people (23.2%) aged 25 to 44, 51 people (32.9%) aged 45 to 64, and 21 people (13.5%)were 65 years of age or older. The median age was 42.8 years. For every 100 females, there were 86.7 males. For every 100 females age 18 and over, there were 89.4 males.

The homeowner vacancy rate was 0%; the rental vacancy rate was 18.2%. 115 people (74.2% of the population) lived in owner-occupied housing units and 40 people (25.8%) lived in rental housing units.

Franklin Cemetery 
There is a cemetery just to the east of Franklin Elementary School, which is the final resting place of many settlers of not only Sacramento County, but from all over California. Its most famous grave is that of Alexander Hamilton Willard, who was a member of the Lewis and Clark Expedition. The grave site is California Historical Landmark #657.

Schools 
 Franklin Elementary School (part of the Elk Grove Unified School District)

Notable people
 Birthplace of Frances Munds, granddaughter of Alexander Hamilton Willard; an American suffragette leader

References

Census-designated places in Sacramento County, California
Census-designated places in California